Anania ieralis is a moth in the family Crambidae. It was described by William James Kaye in 1925. It is found in Trinidad.

References

Moths described in 1925
Pyraustinae
Moths of the Caribbean